Kraig Urbik (born September 23, 1985) is a former American football offensive guard who played nine seasons in the National Football League (NFL). He played college football at Wisconsin after graduating from Hudson High School, and was drafted by the Pittsburgh Steelers in the third round of the 2009 NFL Draft. He also played for the Miami Dolphins and Buffalo Bills.

College career

College awards and honors 
2005 second-team All-American (Sporting News and Rivals.com)
2007 consensus second-team All-Big Ten selection
2008 second-team All-Big Ten selection (Coaches)
2008 first-team All-Big Ten selection (Rivals.com)
2008 ESPN.com first-team All-American

Professional career

Pittsburgh Steelers 
Urbik was considered one of the top guard prospects for the 2009 NFL Draft.

Urbik was selected in the third round of the 2009 NFL Draft by the Pittsburgh Steelers. During his rookie season, he remained largely inactive, losing the top backup guard position to rookie Ramon Foster. Urbik was waived on September 3, 2010.

Buffalo Bills 
Urbik was claimed off waivers on September 5, 2010.

Urbik was slated to start at right guard for them in 2012.  The Bills signed Urbik to a four-year contract extension which locks him up through 2016 and is worth $13.3 million, including a $3.5 million signing bonus for the 2012 season.

Urbik agreed to a pay cut in an effort to stay with the team on March 17, 2015.

Miami Dolphins 
On March 22, 2016, Urbik signed with the Miami Dolphins.

He entered training camp competing with Dallas Thomas, Billy Turner, Jermon Bushrod, and Laremy Tunsil for the starting offensive guard positions. Urbik was named the Dolphins' third-string right guard and center to begin the season.

On September 29, 2016, Urbik had his first start of the season during a 7–22 loss to the  Cincinnati Bengals. On December 17, 2016, he received his first start at center against the New York Jets after Mike Pouncey was placed on injured-reserve for the remainder of the season on December 13, 2016.

On August 26, 2017, Urbik was released by the Dolphins with an injury settlement after suffering a knee injury.

Retirement
On March 8, 2018, Urbik announced his retirement from the NFL after nine seasons.

References

External links 
ESPN profile
Wisconsin Badgers bio

1985 births
Living people
American football centers
American football offensive guards
American football offensive tackles
Buffalo Bills players
Miami Dolphins players
People from Hudson, Wisconsin
Pittsburgh Steelers players
Players of American football from Wisconsin
Sportspeople from the Minneapolis–Saint Paul metropolitan area
Wisconsin Badgers football players